Adamie Niviaxie (1925–?) was an Inuk sculptor.

Early life and education 
He was born in 1925. He lived in Inukjuak, Nunavik, Quebec, Canada. His father was a wood worker who built boats in Kuujjuarapik.

Career 
His sculptures are primarily animals carved in stone.

His work is held in a variety of museums, including the British Museum, the University of Michigan Museum of Art, and the Museum of Anthropology at UBC.

References 

People from Nunavik
20th-century Canadian sculptors
Inuit sculptors
1925 births
Year of death unknown
Artists from Quebec
Animal artists
Canadian male artists
Inuit from Quebec
20th-century Canadian male artists